Echinorhynchida is an order of parasitic worms in the phylum Acanthocephala. It contains the following families:
Arhythmacanthidae Yamaguti, 1935
Cavisomidae Meyer, 1932
Diplosentidae Tubangui and Masiluñgan, 1937
Echinorhynchidae Cobbold, 1876
Fessisentidae Van Cleave, 1931
Gymnorhadinorhynchidae Braicovich, Lanfranchi, Farber, Marvaldi, Luque and Timi, 2014	
Heteracanthocephalidae Petrochenko, 1956
Illiosentidae Golvan, 1960
Isthmosacanthidae Smales, 2012
Pomphorhynchidae Yamaguti, 1939
Rhadinorhynchidae Lühe, 1912
Sauracanthorhynchidae Bursey, Goldberg and Kraus, 2007	
Transvenidae Pichelin and Cribb, 2001

References

 
Palaeacanthocephala